Katha Kathmandu, sometimes known as Katha Kathmandu: Stories of Lust, Love & Life is a 2018 Nepalese drama crime romance film directed and written by Sangita Shrestha. The film is produced by Bijay Rai under the banner of Aahana Films. The film stars Priyanka Karki, Pramod Agrahari, Ayushman Joshi, Sanjog Koirala, Sandhya K.C., and Prekshya Adhikari in the lead roles. The movie is about three inter connections of three men who live in Kathmandu.

Plot 
The first segment in the film is about two couple Noora (Priyanka Karki) and Saurav (Pramod Agrahari). The second segment in the film is about Kavya (Sandhya K.C.) and Rakesh (Sanjog Koirala). And the last segment in the film is about Aayush (Ayushman Joshi) and Sikah (Prekshya Adhikari)

Cast 

 Priyanka Karki as Noora
 Pramod Agrahari as Saurav
 Ayushman Joshi as Aayush
 Sanjog Koirala as Rakesh
 Sandhya K.C. as Kavya
 Prekshya Adhikari as Sikah

Soundtrack

References

External links 

 

Nepalese crime films
2010s Nepali-language films
Romantic crime films